"Sunshine Superman" is a song written and recorded by Scottish singer-songwriter Donovan. It was released as a single in the United States through Epic Records (Epic 5–10045) in July 1966, but due to a contractual dispute the United Kingdom release was delayed until December 1966, where it appeared on Donovan's previous label, Pye Records (Pye 7N 17241).  The single was backed with "The Trip" on both the US and UK releases. It has been described as "[one of the] classics of the era", and as "the quintessential bright summer sing along".

"Sunshine Superman" reached the top of the Billboard Hot 100 in the United States (Donovan's only single to do so) and subsequently became the title track of his third album. When finally released in the UK, it reached No. 2. A different mix of "The Trip" (without harmonica) is also included in the album. The single version of "Sunshine Superman" was edited down from its original four-and-a-half minutes to just over three, and this version was also used on the album; the full-length version made its debut on the Donovan's Greatest Hits LP in 1969.

Musical style
The track is generally considered to be a psychedelic pop, folk rock, psychedelic folk, and psychedelic rock song.

The song was arranged by two jazz musicians, pianist John Cameron and Spike Heatley, who played double bass. John Paul Jones, who would also act as an arranger on some Donovan sessions for producer Mickie Most, played electric bass. Session guitarist Jimmy Page (The Yardbirds, Led Zeppelin) played lead guitar, employing an innovative use of the volume control on his guitar for the repeating figure he played during the verses. Cameron played a two-tier Morley harpsichord on the record. After the success of the song, Cameron would arrange (and play on) many tracks for Donovan and Most.

Billboard described the single as a "rockin' production ballad with an exciting, commercial sound".  Cash Box described the song as a "funky, medium-paced, blues-soaked romancer about a lad who is determined to snare the gal of his dreams," and called it "impressive."

In popular culture
Following the release of the hit song, the name "Sunshine Superman" became widely associated with Donovan himself, and was used as the title or part of the title of about six of his album releases and reissues (including several compilations and a live album as well as being used as the title track of his 1966 studio album).

Various incarnations of a Sunshine Superman have appeared in comics produced by DC Comics, the publishers of the Superman character. Writer Grant Morrison referenced the song in a 1990 issue of Animal Man by creating Sunshine Superman, an African American version of Superman whose S-shield is sun-shaped and who was a member of the Love Syndicate of Dreamworld, from a world based on the drug culture of the 1960s. Sunshine Superman and his world were wiped out by the Crisis on Infinite Earths, only to be brought back by the Psycho-Pirate before fading away again. Sunshine Superman returned for a brief, non-speaking cameo in Final Crisis #7, in an army of alternate Supermen. In September 2011, The New 52 rebooted DC's continuity. In this new timeline, the Dreamworld Earth is reintroduced as Earth-47, where an iteration of Sunshine Superman and the Love Syndicate exist.

Personnel
Donovan – vocals, acoustic guitar, tambura
Jimmy Page and Eric Ford – electric guitars
John Cameron – harpsichord and arrangement
Spike Heatley – double bass
Bobby Orr – drums
Tony Carr – percussion
John Paul Jones – bass
Peter Vince – Abbey Road Engineer

Chart performance

Weekly charts

Year-end charts

The Sports version

Australian rock band The Sports released a version as the lead single from their extended play album, The Sports Play Dylan (and Donovan). The song peaked at number 22 on the Australian Kent Music Report.

Track listing
 Australian 7" Vinyl K-8497
 Side A "Sunshine Superman" – 3:11
 Side B "Cargo Cult" – 2:30

Charts

References

External links
 Sunshine Superman (Single) - Donovan Unofficial Site
 

1966 singles
1981 singles
1966 songs
1960s ballads
Billboard Hot 100 number-one singles
Cashbox number-one singles
Donovan songs
Epic Records singles
Folk ballads
Mushroom Records singles
Pop ballads
Psychedelic pop songs
Psychedelic folk songs
Pye Records singles
Rock ballads
Song recordings produced by Mickie Most
Songs written by Donovan
Superman music
Songs about comics
Songs about fictional male characters
Trini Lopez songs